Cathedral city is a city status in the United Kingdom. 

Cathedral city may also refer to:

 Cathedral City, California, a city in Southern California, United States
 Cathedral City Cheddar, a brand of Cheddar cheese
 Cathedral City High School, a high school in Cathedral City, California

See also 
 Cathedraltown, Ontario